Hibernia is the Classical Latin name for Ireland. The name Hibernia was taken from Greek geographical accounts. During his exploration of northwest Europe (c. 320 BC), Pytheas of Massalia called the island Iérnē (written ). In his book Geographia (c. 150 AD), Claudius Ptolemaeus ("Ptolemy") called the island Iouerníā (written , where "ου"/ou stands for w). The Roman historian Tacitus, in his book Agricola (c. 98 AD), uses the name Hibernia.

 Iouerníā was a Greek rendering of the Q-Celtic name *Īweriū, from which eventually arose the Irish names Ériu and Éire. The name was altered in Latin (influenced by the word hībernus) as though it meant "land of winter", although the word for winter began with a long 'i'.

Post-Roman usage
The High King Brian Boru (c. 941–1014) based his title on being Emperor of the Scoti, which was in Latin Imperator Scottorum, emperor of the Gaels. From 1172, the Lordship of Ireland gave the King of England the additional title Dominus Hibernie (sic, for Hiberniae; also Dominus Hybernie), 'Lord of Ireland'. The Kingdom of Ireland created the title Rex Hiberniae, King of Ireland, for use in Latin texts. Gerard Mercator called Ireland "Hybernia" on his world map of 1541. In 1642, the motto of the Irish Confederates, a Catholic-landlord administration that ruled much of Ireland until 1650, was Pro Deo, Rege et Patria, Hibernia Unanimis (English: 'For God, King and Fatherland, Ireland is United').

By the classicising 18th century, the use of Hibernia had revived in some contexts, just as had the use of Caledonia, one of the Latin terms for Scotland, and Britannia for Britain.  "Hibernia" was used on Irish coins in the 1700s, and on a 2016 2 euro coin. Companies such as the Hibernian Insurance Company were established (later renamed the Hibernian Group). The name took on popularity with the success of the Irish Patriot Party. At a time when Palladian classical architecture and design were being adopted in northern Europe, Hibernia was a useful word to describe Ireland with overtones of classical style and civility, including by the prosperous Anglo-Irish Ascendancy who were taught Latin at school. "Hibernian" was used as a term for people, and a general adjective. The Royal Exchange in Dublin was built during 1769–1779 with the carved inscription "SPQH" for Senatus Populusque Hibernicus 'the senate and people of Ireland'. The Royal Hibernian Academy dates from 1823.

The 18th Century Spanish Regiment composed of Irish exiles was known as the Regiment of Hibernia.

Hibernia is a word that is rarely used today with regard to Ireland, except in long-established names. It is occasionally used for names of organisations and various other things; for instance: Hibernia National Bank, Hibernian Insurance Group, Ancient Order of Hibernians, The Hibernian magazine, Hibernia College, Hibernian Orchestra, Hibernian Football Club, and modern derivatives, from Latin like Respublica Hibernica (Irish Republic) and Universitas Hiberniae Nationalis (National University of Ireland).  In Canada, Hibernia lends its name to the Hibernia oil field off Newfoundland, and to a large offshore oil platform, Hibernia.

Another occurrence is in familial Hibernian fever or TRAPS (tumor necrosis factor receptor-associated periodic syndrome), a periodic fever first described in 1982 in a family of Irish and Scottish descent, but found in all ethnic groups.

The compound form 'Hiberno-' remains more common, as 'Hiberno-Norse', 'Hiberno-English', 'Hiberno-Scottish', 'Hibernophile', etc.

The Scottish football clubs Hibernian FC and Dundee Hibernian (now Dundee Utd) have adopted the name.

See also
 Hibernia (personification)
 Hiberno-English
 Hiberno-Roman relations
 Hibernophile
 Drumanagh
 Scotia

Notes

Latin language
Ancient Ireland
Geographic history of Ireland
Names for Ireland
Terminology of the British Isles